East-West Dedicated Freight Corridor or East-West DFC is a freight specific railway proposed from Eastern to Western India by Indian Railways. The corridor will run between Dankuni in West Bengal and Palghar in Maharashtra. It was announced by then Railway Minister Suresh Prabhu, while presenting the Railway Budget of India in the fiscal year 2016-17. The Government has indicated that they are likely to use a foreign direct investment for funding the project. The project would be undertaken through Public Private Partnership (PPP) model.

Notably, freight trains with a speed of maximum 100 km per hour will pass through the East-West DFC.

References

Transport in Kolkata
Transport in Mumbai
Dedicated freight corridors of India
Rail transport in West Bengal
Rail transport in Odisha
Rail transport in Maharashtra
5 ft 6 in gauge railways in India